Drake Middle School may refer to:

J. F. Drake Middle School, in Auburn, Alabama
O. B. Drake Middle School, in Arvada, Colorado
Pioneer Trail Middle School, in Olathe, Kansas